Beatty may refer to:

Places

U.S. places
 Beatty, Nevada
 Beatty, Ohio
 Beatty, Oregon
 Beatty, Kentucky, now known as Beattyville

Other places
 Beatty, Saskatchewan, Canada
 Beatty, South Australia, Australia
 Mount Mary, South Australia, Australia, named Beatty from 1918 until 1940

Other uses
Beatty (surname)
Beatty Brothers Limited (Canada)

See also
 Beatty Lake (disambiguation)
 Beaty (disambiguation)
 Beattie (disambiguation)
 Batey (disambiguation)